Cryptoblepharus cursor is a species of lizard in the family Scincidae. It is endemic to Indonesia.

References

Cryptoblepharus
Reptiles described in 1911
Reptiles of Indonesia
Endemic fauna of Indonesia
Taxa named by Thomas Barbour